The Sleep Research Society (SRS) is an organization that promotes the science of sleep and related disorders.  Additionally, the SRS is dedicated to the training and education of future sleep researchers.

Organization
The organization traces its roots to a meeting in 1961 of sleep researchers in Chicago, IL.  The group adopted an official name, the Association for the Psychophysiological Study of Sleep (APSS), in 1964.  The name was changed to the Sleep Research Society in 1982.  The acronym APSS is still in use today to refer to the Associated Professional Sleep Societies, which is a partnership between the SRS and the American Academy of Sleep Medicine (AASM).  The society currently has over 1,200 members who are members of one of four sections: Basic Sleep, Circadian Rhythms, Sleep and Behavior, and Sleep Disorders.  Leadership of the society is provided by a 12 member Board of Directors and standing committees.

Foundation
The Sleep Research Society Foundation (SRSF) was founded in 2005.  This foundation provides funding for pilot grants to sleep researchers.  The J. Christian Gillin, M.D. Research Grant provides funding to junior faculty while the Elliott D. Weitzman, M.D. Research Grant provides funding to novel and innovated research.

Publications
The Journal SLEEP''' is a monthly peer reviewed journal, the official publication of the SRS, and the benchmark international journal for sleep and circadian science.  The Editor-in-Chief is Ronald Szymusiak, PhD, with Rachel Manber, PhD, and David Gozal, MD, serving as Deputy Editors-in-Chief. The SRS also publishes SLEEP Advances, a Gold Open Access companion journal to SLEEP. It includes high-quality and replicable basic, translational, and clinical research in sleep and circadian science.

Meeting
The SLEEP annual meeting of the Associated Professional Sleep Societies (APSS) is a yearly scientific meeting held in partnership with the AASM. Approximately 5,000 people attend each year to hear presentations on the latest research.  It is the largest meeting in the United States solely devoted to sleep, circadian rhythms and sleep medicine and is composed of scientific sessions, poster presentations, and an exhibition hall.  Abstracts for presentations are published in a supplemental issue of the journal SLEEP''.

References

External links
 Official website

Sleep medicine organizations
Medical and health organizations based in Illinois
Organizations established in 1964